The 2007–08 Stanford Cardinal men's basketball team represented Stanford University during the 2007–08 NCAA Division I men's basketball season. The Cardinal were led by fourth year head coach Trent Johnson, and played their home games at Maples Pavilion as a member of the Pacific-10 Conference. After the season ended Trent Johnson would leave Stanford and accept the job at LSU.

Previous season
The Cardinal started the season winning eight of their first ten games. After a small stumble against #7 Arizona and in-state rival California, the Cardinal followed it up with seven straight wins, four of which against ranked teams. Following those four wins against ranked teams, they began the next week in the top 25 for the first time under Trent Johnson. While being ranked, Stanford would lose three of their next four and fall out of the top 25 and ended the regular season going 3-3 in the final six games.

Stanford would finish conference play in sixth place and would play third seed USC in the Pac-10 Conference tournament. The Cardinal lost in over time 79–83. They would gain an at-large bid to the 2007 NCAA tournament placed in the South Region as the #11 seed and would play #6 seed Louisville. The Cardinals beat the Cardinal 78–58 ending the Cardinal season at 18–13 overall and 10–8 in conference play.

Offseason

Departures

Incoming

Roster

Schedule and results

|-
!colspan=12 style=| Exhibition

|-
!colspan=12 style=| Regular season

|-
!colspan=12 style=| Pac-10 Conference

|-
!colspan=12 style=| Pac-10 tournament

|-
|-
!colspan=12 style=| NCAA tournament

Rankings

2008 NBA draft

References 

Stanford Cardinal men's basketball seasons
Stanford
Stanford
Stanford Card
Stanford Card